Gary Allen Russell III (born February 4, 1993 in Washington D.C.) is an American amateur boxer and the brother of the WBC featherweight champion Gary Russell, Jr.

Amateur career
Russell won the 2010 National Golden Gloves at Light Welterweight at the Statehouse Convention Center in Little Rock, Arkansas.

See also
Notable boxing families

References

1993 births
Living people
Boxers from Washington, D.C.
Light-welterweight boxers
American male boxers